Cesare Presca (24 February 1921 – 27 December 1979) was an Italian footballer who played as a midfielder. He competed in the men's tournament at the 1948 Summer Olympics.

References

External links
 

1921 births
1979 deaths
Italian footballers
Italy international footballers
Olympic footballers of Italy
Footballers at the 1948 Summer Olympics
Footballers from Trieste
Association football midfielders
U.S. Triestina Calcio 1918 players
Venezia F.C. players